Michael Tellinger is a South African author, politician, explorer and founder of the Ubuntu Party which supports the supply of free resources across society. He has led a campaign against banks and central banks and championed pseudolegal ideas to obtain money from financial institutions. He is also a promoter of pseudoarchaeology influenced by Zecharia Sitchin's ideas of ancient astronauts. presenting the Blaauboschkraal stone ruins, interpreted by mainstream archaeology as 16th century boundary markers, as 'Adam's Calendar', an alien-built structure at the center of a network of stone circles across Southern Africa which purportedly channeled energy in ancient times.

Author 
Tellinger authored or co-authored the following books, three of them self-published through his Zulu Planet Publishers.:

Politics

Tellinger founded a South African political party called Ubuntu Party, named after the principles of Ubuntu Contributionism.

Education 
Michael Tellinger graduated in 1983 from the University Of Witwatersrand Medical School, Johannesburg, with a B.Pharmacy degree.

Music 
He spent much of his early years in the arts performing on stage and screen. As part of the duo "Stirling & Tellinger" he had several music hits in South Africa. In 1986, he worked in Los Angeles for Cannon Films as a sound designer and editor; and wrote and recorded the controversial anti-apartheid song "We come from Johannesburg", which was banned under the previous regime. His latest contribution to the arts was a song called "Side By Side With Angels", for the TSUNAMI disaster fund in 2005, which featured a number of top South African artists.

Campaign against banks 
In 2012, Tellinger was sued in the Johannesburg High Court by Standard Bank for nonpayment of his R828 015 home loan granted in 2007. Tellinger's pseudolegal argument, in a nutshell, was that banks create money "out of the air" and therefore he could do the same. He sent Standard Bank a piece of paper which he said was a "negotiable instrument" for the final payment of the loan. Standard Bank took him to court and within minutes his case was dismissed by Judge Jackson Mabsele. Tellinger was ordered to pay the loan and legal fees of both parties. There was also the possibility that he could be sued for defamation and be declared a "troublesome litigant". He was quoted as saying after the court case that he would take the case to the Constitutional Court.

References

Year of birth missing (living people)
Living people
Tellinger, Michael
Tellinger, Michael
Tellinger, Michael
Pseudoarchaeology
Pseudolaw